Signorile is an Italian surname. Notable people with the surname include:

 Chiaffredo Signorile (1913–1999), Italian writer
 Claudio Signorile (born 1937), Italian socialist politician
 Eugenia Signorile (born 1914), Italian writer
 Michelangelo Signorile (born 1960), American journalist, author, and radio host

Italian-language surnames